Marlisa Ann Punzalan (born 1 October 1999), also known simply as Marlisa, is an Australian singer. She won the sixth season of The X Factor Australia in 2014, aged 15, the youngest contestant to have won the show. Punzalan subsequently received a recording contract with Sony Music Australia and released her debut single "Stand by You", which debuted at number two on the ARIA Singles Chart and was certified platinum by the Australian Recording Industry Association. This was followed by the release of her self-titled debut album Marlisa, which debuted at number six the ARIA Albums Chart and was certified gold. "Stand by You" was nominated for the ARIA Award for Song of the Year in 2015.

Early life
Marlisa Ann Punzalan was born on 1 October 1999 in Sydney to Lito and Andrea Punzalan. Her parents emigrated to Australia from the Philippines before she and her older brother Martin were born. Punzalan lives at Gledenning, Sydney. She began singing at the age of three. In 2013, Punzalan auditioned for the seventh series of Australia's Got Talent but did not make it past the audition rounds, and also attempted to audition for the first series of The Voice Kids, but exceeded the age limit by one month. Before entering the sixth season of The X Factor Australia in 2014, Punzalan was a student at Mercy Catholic College in Chatswood and a regular performer at charity events, eisteddfods and RSL competitions. After becoming the winner of the sixth series, Punzalan left high school to become homeschooled and focus on her music career.

Career

2014: The X Factor Australia
In 2014, Punzalan successfully auditioned for the sixth season of The X Factor Australia, singing "Yesterday" by The Beatles. She received a standing ovation and four yesses from all four judges and progressed to the super bootcamp round of the competition. For the first bootcamp challenge, Punzalan was placed into a group with three other contestants from the Girls category to perform a song together for the judges. Punzalan made it to the second bootcamp challenge, where she performed "Never Be the Same" by Jessica Mauboy to the judges and a live audience of one thousand. She then progressed to the home visits round in New York City and performed "I'll Stand by You" by The Pretenders in front of her mentor Ronan Keating and guest mentor John Legend. Keating later selected Punzalan, along with Sydnee Carter and Caitlyn Shadbolt, for the live finals—a series of eleven weekly live shows in which contestants are progressively eliminated by public vote.

After the eliminations of Carter in week five and Shadbolt in week nine, Punzalan became the last remaining contestant in Keating's category. During the semi-final week, she landed in the bottom two for the first time with Reigan Derry and performed John Farnham's version of The Beatles' "Help!" in the final showdown. After the judges' vote went to deadlock, it was revealed that Punzalan received the most public votes and was put through to the grand final. During the grand final decider show on 20 October 2014, Punzalan was announced as the winner of the sixth season, becoming the first contestant from the Girls category to win.

Performances on The X Factor

2014–2017: Marlisa
After winning The X Factor, Punzalan's debut and winner's single "Stand by You" was made available to download on the iTunes Store. She also received a recording contract with Sony Music Australia. Four days after release, "Stand by You" debuted at number two on the ARIA Singles Chart. It was certified platinum by the Australian Recording Industry Association for sales exceeding 70,000 copies. "Stand by You" also peaked at number seven on the Singapore Singles Chart and number 21 on the New Zealand Singles Chart. An official YouTube audio of "Stand by You" published on the same day of the winner announcement help garnered interest on the single which triggered the debut at number 29 on the Billboard Twitter Real-Time Emerging Artists Chart. Punzalan's self-titled debut album, Marlisa, was released on 7 November 2014 and features studio recordings of selected songs she performed on The X Factor. It debuted at number six on the ARIA Albums Chart and number 11 on the New Zealand Albums Chart. The album was certified gold by the ARIA for shipments of more than 35,000 units and was the 83rd best-selling album of 2014 in Australia.

In late 2014, Punzalan performed two concerts at Rooty Hill RSL Club to thank her local fans. In December 2014, Punzalan and other Australian singers recorded a cover version of Kate Bush's "This Woman's Work" under the name "Hope for Isla and Jude", and released it as a charity single to help raise funds for two siblings who suffer from the rare disease Sanfilippo syndrome. Their version debuted at number 79 on the ARIA Singles Chart. To celebrate the Philippines' 117th Independence Day, Punzalan released a Filipino version of her second single "Unstoppable" in the Philippines on 12 June 2015. Her third single "Forever Young" was released on 6 November 2015. In 2017, it was speculated that Punzalan had been dropped by record company Sony Music. She is no longer listed as an artist on the company website.

2018: "Thank You"
In June 2018, Marlisa released "Thank You", her first single in two and a half years, on the ABS-CBN Film Productions label.

Artistry
Aside from singing, Punzalan also plays the piano. She cites Eva Cassidy and Jessica Mauboy as her musical influences.

Discography

Studio albums

Singles

Other charted songs

Music videos

Awards and nominations

References

Further reading

External links

Marlisa Punzalan's Journey – Audition to Grand Final

1999 births
21st-century Australian singers
Australian people of Filipino descent
Australian child singers
The X Factor (Australian TV series) contestants
The X Factor winners
Singers from Sydney
Living people
21st-century Australian women singers